Mary Rosenblum (born Mary Freeman; June 27, 1952 – March 11, 2018) was an American science fiction and mystery author.

Biography
Rosenblum was born in Levittown, New York and grew up in Allison Park, Pennsylvania. She earned a biology degree from Reed College in Oregon. Rosenblum attended the Clarion West Writers Workshop in 1988.

Her first story came out in 1990 and her first novel in 1993. Her career began in, and largely returned to, science fiction. However, from 1999 to 2002 she wrote the "Gardening Mysteries" novel series under the name "Mary Freeman." Her gardening-involved mystery novels are said to be significantly different from her science fiction and so her two followings do not necessarily overlap. In 1994, she won the Compton Crook Award for Best First Novel for the novel, The Drylands. In 2009 she won the Sidewise Award for Alternate History Short Form for her story, "Sacrifice."

Rosenblum was also an accomplished cheesemaker who taught the craft at selected workshops.

At the age of 57, Rosenblum earned her airman certificate. Residing in Oregon, she was one of only 10% of pilots in that state who are female.

Death
Rosenblum died on March 11, 2018, when the single-engine plane she was piloting crashed near an airfield south of La Center, Washington.

Bibliography

Novels
The Drylands (1993)
Chimera (1993)
The Stone Garden (1994)
Devil's Trumpet (1999) writing as Mary Freeman
Deadly Nightshade (1999) writing as Mary Freeman
Bleeding Heart (2000) writing as Mary Freeman
Garden View (2002) writing as Mary Freeman
Water Rites (2006)
Horizons (2007)

Collections
Synthesis & Other Virtual Realities (1996)

Selected short stories
"Shoals" (2013) in Old Mars (anthology)
 "Home Movies" (2006) in Asimov's Science Fiction.

References

External links
Mary Rosenblum's website

1952 births
2018 deaths
People from Levittown, New York
Reed College alumni
Writers from New York (state)
20th-century American novelists
21st-century American novelists
American mystery writers
American science fiction writers
American alternate history writers
American women short story writers
American women novelists
Sidewise Award winners
Women science fiction and fantasy writers
Women mystery writers
20th-century American women writers
21st-century American women writers
Women historical novelists
Accidental deaths in Washington (state)
20th-century American short story writers
21st-century American short story writers
Victims of aviation accidents or incidents in 2018
Aviators killed in aviation accidents or incidents in the United States
Writers from Oregon
American women aviators